Apollonius Attaleus was a man mentioned by Artemidorus as being the author of a work on dreams. We know he lived in or before the 2nd century, but nothing else.

Notes

Ancient Greek writers